Warren Wheat (born May 13, 1967) is a former American football guard. He played for the Seattle Seahawks in 1989 and 1991. Wheat played college football at Brigham Young University and was selected in the eighth round of the 1989 NFL Draft by the Los Angeles Rams.

References

1967 births
Living people
American football offensive guards
BYU Cougars football players
Seattle Seahawks players